Ricardo Franco (born September 4, 1980, in Mexico City, Mexico), is a Mexican television actor.

Filmography

Television

References

External links 

1980 births
21st-century Mexican male actors
Mexican male telenovela actors
Male actors from Mexico City
Living people